Guillermo Pérez Roldán won the title, defeating Germán López 2–6, 7–5, 6–3 in the final.

Seeds

  Thomas Muster (second round)
  Guillermo Pérez Roldán (champion)
  Lars Koslowski (first round)
  Germán López (final)
  Roberto Azar (second round)
  Claudio Pistolesi (first round)
  Eduardo Masso (first round)
  Bart Wuyts (semifinals)

Draw

Finals

Top half

Bottom half

External links
 ATP – 1992 Grand Prix Hassan II Singles draw

Singles